is a Japanese regional bank that is based out of Yamagata city, Yamagata prefecture.  Most of the bank's branches are in Yamagata prefecture, or other major cities in the Tohoku region, with a branch in Tokyo as well.  The principal shareholders as of March 2005 were The Bank of Tokyo-Mitsubishi, Ltd. and Meiji Yasuda Life Insurance Company.

History
Yamagata Bank can trace its origins to 1878, when The 81st National Bank was founded.  In 1897, this bank was later absorbed by the Ryouu Bank, which was established one year earlier.  The bank merged with numerous small financial institutions over the first half of the 20th century, and finally changed its name to its present form in 1965.

In October 2005, Yamagata Bank, along with the Saitama Resona Bank, 82 Bank and Hokkoku Bank jointly injected funds into Allegro MicroSystems, an American subsidiary of Sanken Electric Co. Ltd., after Sanken purchased Minnesota-based semiconductor producer PolarFab.

See also

List of banks
List of banks in Japan

External links
 Nikkei article over Yamagata Bank’s injection of capital into PolarFab (Japanese)
  Google Finance
  Hoovers Report
 Yamagata Bank

Regional banks of Japan
Companies based in Yamagata Prefecture
Companies listed on the Tokyo Stock Exchange
Banks established in 1878
Japanese companies established in 1878